Pål Andre Czwartek (born 25 April 1975) is a former Norwegian footballer. He is the only player left in the Fredrikstad squad from the club's time in third tier of the Norwegian league. His grandfather was Polish.

Career statistics

References

1975 births
Living people
People from Østfold
Norwegian footballers
Sarpsborg FK players
Fredrikstad FK players
Norwegian people of Polish descent
Eliteserien players
Association football defenders
Sportspeople from Viken (county)